Anna Medical College is a college in Mauritius. It is currently affiliated with University of Technology, Mauritius. It is located in Montagne Blanche, South-East of the Island and offers only the MBBS program (Bachelor of Medicine, Bachelor of Surgery).

Accreditations
Anna Medical College is listed with following agencies:
Tertiary Education Commission, Mauritius
World Federation for Medical Education & Foundation for Advancement of International Medical Education and Research
Medical Council of India

References

Medical schools in Mauritius